The 2020 Trophée des Champions was the 25th edition of the French super cup. The match was contested by the 2019–20 Ligue 1 champions and 2019–20 Coupe de France winners Paris Saint-Germain, and the Ligue 1 runners-up Marseille.

The match marked the 99th time Classique rivals Paris Saint-Germain and Marseille played against each other and the second time in the Trophée des Champions, after their first meeting in 2010.

Paris Saint-Germain were the seven-time defending champions. They won the match 2–1 for their tenth Trophée des Champions title.

The match was televised live on the new French joint venture TF1-Mediapro's football channel Téléfoot and other international broadcasters throughout several countries as the part of the four-year LFP broadcasting rights package contracts.

Host selection
In February 2020, the LFP evokes three venues for hosting the 2020 Champions Trophy to take place originally on 1 August 2020, such as: both venues at the outside France (Abidjan in Côte d'Ivoire and Minneapolis in USA) and Bordeaux in France.

Impact of COVID-19 pandemic
The decision for host venue was originally to be taken in the spring but the three cities were not chosen due to the COVID-19 pandemic and the match was postponed to January 2021.

Match

Summary
Mauro Icardi opened the scoring in the 39th minute when his header from a cross from the right was initially saved and pushed onto the post by goalkeeper Steve Mandanda, he followed up to tap in the rebound from a yard out. Neymar made it 2–0 in the 85th minute with a penalty, sending the goalkeeper the wrong way to shoot into the right corner of the net after Mauro Icardi had been brought down by Yohann Pelé. Dimitri Payet got a goal back for Marseille in the 89th minute when he finished to the left corner of the net from six yards out after a low cross from the right.

Details

Notes

References

External links
  

2020
2020–21 in French football
Paris Saint-Germain F.C. matches
Olympique de Marseille matches
Association football events postponed due to the COVID-19 pandemic